Black Mill, or Borstal Hill Mill is a smock mill in Whitstable, Kent, England that was built in 1815. It is now a part of a private residence at the end of Millers Court.

History

Black Mill was built in 1815. A mill that previously stood on the site was marked on Bowen's map of 1736. The mill had been painted white when built, but was tarred in 1885, thus gaining its name of Black Mill. Trinity House had to be notified, as the mill was a navigational landmark for sailors. The mill last worked circa 1905 and in 1928 was converted into a studio by the artist Laurence Irving, the grandson of Sir Henry Irving. The mill was later converted into a motel. The converted tower still contains the major milling machinery, and externally bears stocks and a dummy fantail.

Description

Black mill is a four-storey smock mill on a single-storey brick base. There was a stage at first-floor level. It had four patent sails carried on a cast-iron windshaft. The Brake wheel survives. This drove a cast-iron Wallower mounted on a wooden Upright Shaft. The Great Spur Wheel also survives. The mill drove three pairs of millstones overdrift. It was winded by a fantail.

Millers

Lawes & Carr 1839 - 1845
William Carr 1845
Jonathan Rye
Henry Somerford 1860 - 1866
James Callingham 1866 -
Callingham Bros. - 1899
George & William Dawking 1899 - 1905

References for above:-

Gallery

References

Further reading

External links
Windmill World page on the mill.

Windmills in Kent
Grinding mills in the United Kingdom
Smock mills in England
Windmills completed in 1815
Whitstable
Octagonal buildings in the United Kingdom